Sneakers was a Danish rock band from the early 1980s. Among its members were vocalist Sanne Salomonsen and on keyboards Morten Kærså.

Members 
 Morten Kærså – keyboard & vocal (1979-1985)
 Sanne Salomonsen – vocal (1979-1985)
 Klaus Menzer – drums (1979-1985)
 Jacob Andersen – percussion (1979-1985)
 Poul Halberg – guitar (1979-1980)
 Moussa Diallo - bas (1979-1980)
 Mikkel Nordsø – guitar (1980-1985)
 Christian Dietl – bas (1980-1985)

Discography

Studio albums
1980: Sneakers
1981: Sui-sui
1982: Rou'let
1984: Katbeat

Compilation albums 
1988: Sneakers / Sui-sui 
1994: Totale
1997: Sneakers Greatest (2 CDs)
2005: Woodoo
2005: Tag med mig
2005: De kender ikke Jimmi
2008: Sneakers & Sanne Salomonsen (3 CDs)
2008: Dejlige danske ... (2 CDs)

External links
 
 Sneakers at the Danish music site www.bluedesert.dk

Danish rock music groups